Pierre Kotouo (12 May 1916 in Goufan-Kiki, Cameroon - 10 February 1993 in Yaoundé) was a Cameroonian politician who served in the French Senate from 1955 to 1958.

References

Cameroonian politicians
French Senators of the Fourth Republic
1916 births
1993 deaths
Senators of French Equatorial Africa